Kalapipal Mandi or Pankhedi is a  City in Shajapur district of Madhya Pradesh, India.  It is located on Western railways Bhopal - Ujjain section and is connected by railway to some major city's of Madhya Pradesh like Bhopal, Indore and Ujjain. Nearest airport Bhopal.

Transport

Roadways 

 From Bhopal- 78 km
 From Indore- 165 km

There are more than 100 buses that operates daily from here. Kalapipal is connection between Kalapipal tehsil's Villages to railways, because villages like ganeshpur, khokra, kardon, Behrawal, kurawar etc. has no rail connectivity. It is located 38 km from indore-bhopal state highway.
There are 2 major Airports near kalapipal.

1. Raja Bhoj International Airport Bhopal (66 KM).

2. Devi Ahilya Bai Holkar International Airport Indore (191 KM).

Railways 

Kalapipal Railway Station lies on the Ujjain—Bhopal WR-WCR link. Kalapipal is a class D Major station. There are regular trains plying to Delhi, Rajkot, Ahmedabad, Ratlam, Mathura, Somnath, Jaipur, Jabalpur, Itarsi, Ajmer, Bilaspur, Indore, Sehore, Bhopal, Ujjain, Gwalior, Jammu, Shri Mata Vaishno Devi Katra and other major cities.

Religion 

Kalapipal has a nearby sacred temple called teliya hanuman mandir. Kalapipal has 2 lakes which are majorly used as a stopdam for the purpose or irrigation.

Education 
Kala pipal is well known in the region for its education system. For many years, students from kala pipal Mandi have secured there place in various merit lists. The literacy rate of whole town is above average. Some of the major schools are:
Kasturba Gandhi Higher Secondary school 
 Saraswati vidhya mandir H. S.School; 
 Sahara Public H.S.School;
 Tagore Convent School;
 St.Teresa's Convent Higher Secondary School;
 S.D. Public School;
 MVM Higher Secondary School;

 Natural Public Higher Secondary School.

Kala Pipal have a Government College Named Rajiv Gandhi Government College where students can get admission into higher education course like B.A.,B.com and B.sc For technical Knowledge Kala pipal also has ITI College where student can learn various courses like Electrician and Fitter Etc.Demand of PG courses is  increasing as kala pipal is connected to 125 villages and student find it easy going to kala pipal instead of sehore or shujalpur.the politician promised that Govt college will be upgraded to PG Level but this haven't happen till 2020.

Kalapipal Mandi tehsil 

Kalapipal mandi is a Tehsil. The total population of Kalapipal Tehsil is 171,624 living in 28,105 Houses, Spread across a total of 127 villages, and 77 panchayats. Males are 89,372 and Females are 82,252.
There are demands from the people of Kalapipal For Opening of Civil Court In the city. SDM office is also required in the city and Declaration of Kalapipal Being Made Revenue Sub-Division Is Increasing due to the level of revenue cases are increasing day by day in the tehsil office and for any matter related to SDM office, the people have to go to Shujalpur. Which results in a waste of time and money for villagers. Lack of Political Support Has Caused Kalapipal To remain Without Civil Court And SDM Office Till 2019.

Demographics                                                                                                                                                    
Kalapipal has been recently given the status of an Urban Body under the name of Nagar Parishad Pankhedi(Kalapipal Mandi). Kalapipal's total population is 18723 according to the 2011 census with 2631 households under the town.

Behrawal village, one of the biggest villages in the Shajapur district is situated in Kalapipal Mandi tehsil.
Arniyakalan Is the Biggest Village Of Tehsil.

Kalapipal is a place of political Figures. In 2008 it was given the status of legislative Assembly Babulal Verma was the first MLA of Kalapipal then In 2013 Indersingh Parmar of Bhartiya Janta Party Became the MLA. In 2018 Vidhansabha Election Kunal Choudhary of Congress Won The Election And Become First Congress MLA of Kalapipal.

External links 
https://web.archive.org/web/20090410024726/http://shajapur.nic.in/teh_town.htm
http://mpvidhansabha.nic.in/

Cities and towns in Shajapur district